A'Darius Lamar Pegues (born March 21, 1988) is an American-born Ugandan basketball player who last played for Patriots BBC.

Career
In November 2019, Pegues signed with Rwandan club Patriots BBC to play in the qualifying tournament for the Basketball Africa League (BAL). Pegues and the Patriots managed to qualify.

Pegues represented Uganda's national basketball team at the 2017 AfroBasket in Tunisia and Senegal, where he recorded the most rebounds for Uganda.

References

External links
 FIBA profile
 Latinbasket.com profile

1988 births
Living people
American men's basketball players
American expatriate basketball people in Rwanda
Basketball players from North Carolina
Campbellsville Tigers men's basketball players
Centers (basketball)
Indiana–Southeast Grenadiers men's basketball players
Patriots BBC players
Sportspeople from Fayetteville, North Carolina
Tarleton State Texans men's basketball players
Ugandan men's basketball players